= Creating Masculinity in Los Angeles's Little Manila =

2006 book on masculinity

- Author: Linda España-Maram
- Language: English
- Genre: Non-fiction
- Publisher: Columbia University Press
- Publication date: 2006
- Publication place: United States

Creating Masculinity in Los Angeles's Little Manila: Working-Class Filipinos and Popular Culture, 1920s-1950s is a 2006 non-fiction book authored by Linda España-Maram. It was published by Columbia University Press.
